Brachygalaxias bullocki (known locally as puye) is a species of fish in the family Galaxiidae endemic to Chile. It was listed as Vulnerable since 1994 until changed to Data Deficient in 1996.

References

Brachygalaxias
Freshwater fish of Chile
Taxa named by Charles Tate Regan
Fish described in 1908
Taxonomy articles created by Polbot
Endemic fauna of Chile